Surgical and Radiologic Anatomy is a peer-reviewed medical journal that publishes original research and review articles on the bases of medical, surgical and radiologic anatomy. According to the Journal Citation Reports, the journal has a 2018 impact factor of 1.039, ranking it 16th out of 21 journals in the category "Anatomy & Morphology". The journal ranked 164th out of 203 journals under "Surgery" category.

References

External links 
Journal website

Springer Science+Business Media academic journals
Publications established in 1978
English-language journals
Anatomy journals
Quarterly journals